The men's 800 metres at the 2017 Asian Athletics Championships was held on 8 and 9 July.

Medalists

Results

Heats

Qualification rule: First 2 in each heat (Q) and the next 3 fastest (q) qualified for the final.

Final

References

800
800 metres at the Asian Athletics Championships